Stephen John Baddeley (born 1961) is a retired male badminton player from England who competed from the early 1980s to the early 1990s.

Badminton career
Baddeley won the English men's singles title in 1982, 1985, and 1987. He is the only Englishman to win men's singles at the quadrennial British Commonwealth Games and one of only two to win the gold medal in men's singles at the biennial European Badminton Championships (1990).

He represented England and won a gold medal in the team event, at the 1982 Commonwealth Games in Brisbane, Queensland, Australia. In addition he participated in the singles.

Four years later he represented England and won double gold in singles and team event, at the 1986 Commonwealth Games in Edinburgh, Scotland.

Achievements

European Championships 
Men's singles

Commonwealth Games 
Men's singles

IBF World Grand Prix 
The World Badminton Grand Prix sanctioned by International Badminton Federation (IBF) from 1983 to 2006.

Men's singles

Men's doubles

Management
In 2004 he took over as Director of Sport for Sport England. Steve Baddeley took over from Ged Roddy as Director of Sports for Team Bath at the University of Bath in February 2010.

References

English male badminton players
Living people
1961 births
Commonwealth Games medallists in badminton
Commonwealth Games gold medallists for England
Badminton players at the 1990 Commonwealth Games
Badminton players at the 1986 Commonwealth Games
Badminton players at the 1982 Commonwealth Games
People educated at Hove Grammar School
TeamBath coaches
Medallists at the 1982 Commonwealth Games
Medallists at the 1986 Commonwealth Games